Sitam is a 2021 Pakistani television soap family drama series aired on Hum TV from 17 May 2021 to 6 August 2021. It is produced by Syed Mukhtar Ahmed in collaboration with Momina Duraid under Gold Bridge Media and MD Productions. It stars Usama Khan, Moomal Khalid, Nawal Saeed and Saad Qureshi in lead roles.

The serial released on Hum TV airing five episodes per week (from Monday to Friday) on 7:00 PST.

Cast
Usama Khan as Shayan
Nawal Saeed as Fareeha
Saad Qureshi as Salman
Moomal Khalid as Ayesha
Kiran Tabeir as Maida
Azra Mohyeddin as Nighat
Laila Wasti as Faryaal
Ayesha Khan as Rabia
Afraz Rasool as Haseeb
Farah Nadeem as Rubina
Marie Bhatti as Zoya
Talia Jan as Minahil
Rameez Siddiqui as Ali
Ayaz Mughal as Jamal
Usman Javed as Sikandar
Areesha Javed as Sara
Farhad Riaz as Hassan
Sara Malik as Shaista
Areej Chaudhary as Ramsha
Salma Asim as Khadijah
Sameera Hassan as Feroza
Imran Baloch
Kamal Khan
Ali Raza
Ahmer Peerzada
Ilma Jaffery

References

External Links
 Sitam- Hum TV official

2021 Pakistani television series debuts
2021 Pakistani television series endings
Hum TV original programming